Piper Orchard is a fruit orchard containing primarily heirloom apple trees, located within Seattle Washington's Carkeek Park.

History

Early
The orchard was planted in what was then the homestead of notable Seattle settler A. W. Piper, sometime
after the Great Seattle Fire of 1889 which destroyed the Pipers' downtown business, the Puget Sound Candy Factory.

The orchard is located on a hillside in what is now known as Piper Canyon, above Pipers Creek.

Mrs Wilhelmina (or Minna for short) Piper was the primary gardener and grafter.

One of the Pipers's sons, Paul Piper, used to take the fruit to market in Seattle.

Restoration
In 1983 a group of volunteers began clearing away overgrowth that had hidden the orchard from most people. The Adopt-A-Park office of the Seattle Department of Parks and Recreation encouraged the work. Twenty-nine surviving fruit varieties were discovered on the  cleared of overgrowth. A tree planting grid of  squares was apparent from the locations of the surviving trees, most of which are apple and were available in 1890. Included are Wealthy, King, Gravenstein, Dutch Mignone, Red Astrachan, Rhode Island Greening, Bietigheimer, and Esopus Spitzenburg. There are also several pear, cherry, and chestnut trees.

Current status
There are about fifty fruit and nut trees in the orchard arranged on a grid demarked A-L going up the hill, and 1-16 going across to the right. About half have been added or grafted from old stock since the restoration in 1984.

The orchard is currently cared for by a combination of Seattle Parks employed and volunteer labor from the community. The volunteer work is facilitated by the Friends of Piper Orchard organization who work with the Carkeek Park office of Seattle Parks to facilitate volunteering and orchard work party and community festival planning.

Work parties meet most months of the year on the third Saturday to prune, clean up, or do other maintenance work in the orchard.

Festival of Fruit
An annual Festival of Fruit has been held at the orchard since 2007, where, among other activities, visitors can participate in an apple pie baking contest or taste heirloom apple varieties from Piper Orchard.

References

External links 

 Friends of Piper Orchard neighborhood group website
 Seattle Parks and Recreation - Carkeek Park

Broadview, Seattle
Gardens in Washington (state)
Orchards
Parks in Seattle